A  (Italian for "toast") is a song in which a company is exhorted to drink, a drinking song.

The word is Italian, but it derives from an old German phrase,  – "(I) offer it to you", which at one time was used to introduce a toast. The transformation of that phrase into the current Italian word may have been influenced by similar-sounding name of the Italian city of Brindisi, but otherwise the city and the term are etymologically unrelated.

The term brindisi is often used in opera. Typically, in an operatic , one character introduces a toast with a solo melody and the full ensemble later joins in the refrain.

Some well-known operatic numbers labeled  are:

 "Cantiamo, facciam brindisi", chorus in Gaetano Donizetti's L'Elisir d'Amore
 "Libiamo ne' lieti calici", sung by Alfredo and Violetta in act 1 of Verdi's La traviata
 "Viva, il vino spumeggiante", sung by Turiddu in scene 2 of Mascagni's Cavalleria rusticana
 "Il segreto per esser felici", sung by Orsini in act 2 of Donizetti's Lucrezia Borgia
 "Inaffia l'ugola!", sung by Iago in act 1 of Verdi's Otello
 "Si colmi il calice", sung by Lady Macbeth in act 2 of Verdi's Macbeth
 "The Tea-Cup Brindisi", in the finale of act 1 of Gilbert and Sullivan's The Sorcerer
 "Ô vin, dissipe la tristesse" sung by Hamlet in act 2 of Thomas's Hamlet

Notes

References

External links
, Glyndebourne Festival Opera 2014 (with English subtitles)

Italian opera terminology